Gilbertson Sangma (born 12 April 1955) is a former Indian footballer. He played as a striker.

Playing career
Sangma received early lessons of football at the Police Reserve in Dergaon.

Assam
In 1973, he began his senior career in the Inter District Football Championships by representing Golaghat. He was selected immediately in the Assam state team for the Santosh Trophy. In 1974–75, he scored the goal that knocked out the defending champions Kerala and took Assam to the quarter-final. He represented the state team seven times from 1973 to 1980 in Santosh Trophy.

Assam Police
After joining the Assam Police he became a regular player of the Assam Police team since 1972. He helped the team to lift several trophies including Bordoloi Trophy, Independence Day Cup, ATPA Shield etc.

International career
In 1975, Sangma was picked in the Indian team for three International friendly matches in Indonesia and Thailand.

Personal life
Sangma retired from Assam Police as a top official. After retirement, he is regularly associated with different local football activities in Guwahati.

References

Indian footballers
1955 births
Living people
People from Dibrugarh district
Footballers from Assam
India international footballers
Garo people
Association football forwards